Singapore Poetry Writing Month (SingPoWriMo) is a month-long event held in April for Singaporeans to write poetry. During SingPoWriMo, daily writing prompts are given by Singaporean poets on Facebook, and Singaporeans are encouraged to share their poetry on the platform, where they can receive feedback by the organisers and other participants. Selected poems are published in an annual anthology.  In 2019, SingPoWriMo started an Instagram page to complement its Facebook. Participants can also submit their poems through Instagram, where they will be featured on the page. Its name is inspired by NaNoWriMo, an American event that encourages people to write a novel in the month of November.

History 
SingPoWriMo was initiated in April 2014 by Joshua Ip as a private Facebook page for other Singaporean poets, including Alfian Sa'at and Alvin Pang to share and critique poetry. However, Ip did not make the Facebook group private on accident. By the end of the month, the group had attracted over 400 participants. Ip decided to continue the event, which is now organised by Sing Lit Station, a literary charity also founded by him. In its current form, Ip has described the event as "poetry with peer pressure." A study by the Nanyang Technological University has found that the use of Singlish in SingPoWriMo poems are not well received by other poets due to its use as a comedic effect.

In 2019, the Tamil Language Council organised a Tamil language SingPoWriMo competition that is unrelated to the Sing Lit Station organised event. In the same year, in response to poor sales of the SingPoWriMo hardcopy anthology, Sing Lit Station ceased the publication of the anthology, choosing instead to publish featured poems on an online magazine.

Singapore Poetry on the Bus 
In 2017, SingPoWriMo participants were invited to recite poetry on bus 67 of the Singapore public bus system. Earlier that year, Sing Lit Station also organised a poetry recital on the MRT trains.

References 

Singaporean literature